Mark Crilly (born 23 May 1980), is a Scottish professional footballer who was most recently co-manager of Junior side Kilbirnie Ladeside. Crilly began his senior career with Ayr United in 1998. He went on to play for Dumbarton, Stirling Albion, St Mirren, Raith Rovers and Stranraer, making over 150 appearances in the Scottish Football League.

Crilly was appointed co-manager of Kilbirnie Ladeside in March 2012 in partnership with ex-Pollok teammate Stephen Swift but resigned citing work commitments in February 2015.

External links

References

Living people
1980 births
Scottish footballers
Ayr United F.C. players
Dumbarton F.C. players
Stirling Albion F.C. players
St Mirren F.C. players
Raith Rovers F.C. players
Stranraer F.C. players
Irvine Meadow XI F.C. players
Pollok F.C. players
Scottish Premier League players
Scottish Football League players
Scottish Junior Football Association players
Association football midfielders
Scottish football managers
Scotland junior international footballers